The strontium unit is a unit used to measure the amount of radioactivity from strontium-90, a radionuclide found in nuclear fallout, in a subject's body. Since the human body absorbs strontium as if it were calcium, incorporating it into the skeleton, its presence is very common. One strontium unit is equal to one picocurie from strontium-90 per gram of calcium (37 becquerels per kilogram) in the subject's skeleton.

The United States National Academy of Sciences holds that the maximum safe measure of strontium-90 in a person is one hundred strontium units (3700 Bq/kg). The average American is estimated to have three to four strontium units.

The strontium unit was formerly known briefly as the sunshine unit, a doublespeak term promoted by the United States Department of Defense until public ridicule brought about its disuse. Among the sources of this outcry was a George Carlin performance, released on the CD Parental Advisory: Explicit Lyrics, during a passage on governmental euphemisms for dangerous or unethical activities: "The Pentagon actually measures nuclear radiation in something they call 'sunshine units'!"

See also
Project GABRIEL
Project SUNSHINE
Banana equivalent dose

References

Units of radiation dose
Strontium